Ozan Yildirim (born 11 January 1992), professionally known as Oz (stylized as OZ), is a Swiss record producer and songwriter of Turkish descent. He has produced for many high-profile artists, including Drake, Shindy, and Travis Scott, most notably on the number one hits "Highest in the Room", "Life Is Good" and "Sicko Mode". He has received nominations for the Grammy Award for Best Rap Song for "Sicko Mode" and "Gold Roses". He also solely produced Drake's number-one hit "Toosie Slide".

Production discography

Charted songs

Production credits

2013 

Nazar - OZ Interlude

2014 
 Fabolous – Ball Drop (feat. French Montana) from The Young OG Project 
 Travis Scott – Backyard from Days Before Rodeo 
 The Game – Really (feat. Yo Gotti, 2 Chainz, Soulja Boy & T.I.) from Blood Moon: Year of the Wolf 
Summer Cem – Nike Airs from HAK

2015 
 DJ Khaled – How Many Times from I Changed a Lot
 Meek Mill – Been That (feat. Rick Ross), and Cold Hearted (feat. Puff Daddy) from Dreams Worth More Than Money
 G-Eazy – Random from When It's Dark Out
 Chinx – Hey Fool (feat. Nipsey Hussle & Zack) from Welcome to JFK
 Logic – I Am the Greatest from The Incredible True Story
 Jeremih – Giv No Fuks (feat. Migos) from Late Nights: The Album

2016 
 Drake – U With Me? from Views
 Ali Bumaye – Best Friends (feat. Bushido) and Missgestalten from Rumble in the Jungle
 Meek Mill – Offended (feat. Young Thug & 21 Savage) and Outro (feat. Lil Snupe & French Montana) from DC4
 Dreezy – See What You On from No Hard Feelings
 Travis Scott – the ends and outside from Birds in the Trap Sing McKnight
 Shindy – Dreams [full album]
 Gucci Mane – Drove U Crazy (feat. Bryson Tiller) from The Return of East Atlanta Santa
 6lack – Rules from Free 6lack

2017 
 Khalid – Saved, Let's Go, and Keep Me, from American Teen
 Travis Scott & Quavo / Huncho Jack – Dubai Shit (feat. Offset) from Huncho Jack, Jack Huncho
Bushido – Moonwalk
 DRAM – I Had a Dream, Crumbs (feat. Playboi Carti), and Eyeyieyie, from Big Baby DRAM
 G-Eazy – Shake It Up (feat. 24hrs, MadeinTYO and E-40)

2018 
 Nav – Champions (feat. Travis Scott) from Reckless 
 Logic – Contra  and Wizard of OZ , from Bobby Tarantino 2
 Trippie Redd - UKA UKA, BANG!, Shake It Up, Gore, and Missing My Idols, from Life's a Trip
 6lack – Cutting Ties
 Smokepurpp & Murda Beatz – Big Dope from Bless Yo Trap 
 RIN (Rapper) – Avirex, Burberry/SuperParisLight, Oldboy, XTC and Outro (on Planet Megatron)
 Lil Baby – Bank (feat. Moneybagg Yo) from Harder Than Ever 
Travis Scott – Sicko Mode from Astroworld 
 Tory Lanez – FeRRis WhEEL (feat. Trippie Redd) from Love Me Now? 
 Trippie Redd – Can't Love, Love Scars 3, A.L.L.T.Y. 3 (feat. Baby Goth), Emani Interlude (feat. Emani22), Wicked, Loyalty Before Royalty, and 1400 / 999 Freestyle (feat. Juice WRLD), from A Love Letter to You 3
Meek Mill – 24/7 (feat. Ella Mai) from Championships

2019 
 Shindy – "DODI"
 Zacari – "Midas Touch" 
 Tory Lanez – "Freaky" 
 Shindy – Drama 
 Nav – "To My Grave" from Bad Habits 
 Drake – "Omertà" from The Best in the World Pack 
 Dreamville – "Got Me" (featuring Ari Lennox, Omen, Ty Dolla Sign and Dreezy) from Revenge of the Dreamers III 
 Rick Ross – "Gold Roses" (featuring Drake) from Port of Miami 2 
 Trippie Redd — "Throw It Away", "Be Yourself", and "Lil Wayne", from !
 Travis Scott – "Highest in the Room" 
 Young M.A. – "Bipolar" 
Killumantii - "Kill Em" 
 Tinashe - "Story of Us" from Songs for You

2020 
Future - "Life Is Good" 
Drake - "Toosie Slide"
Shindy - "What's Luv" and "Sony Pictures"
UFO361 - "Bad Girls, Good Vibes"
Drake - "Time Flies" from Dark Lane Demo Tapes
Drake - "Losses" from Dark Lane Demo Tapes 
 DJ Khaled - "Greece" (featuring Drake) 
 DJ Khaled - "Popstar" (featuring Drake) 
 Gunna - "Relentless" (featuring Lil Uzi Vert) from Wunna (Deluxe)

References

Living people
Swiss record producers
1992 births
Swiss people of Turkish descent